Sacred Heart Cathedral is a Roman Catholic Cathedral in the Canadian City of Prince George, British Columbia.

The Cathedral also serves as the Mother Church for the Diocese of Prince George.

Clergy 
The current rector of the Sacred Heart Cathedral is Very Reverend Rectorino Tolentino Jr, who was the Vicar-General of the Diocese of Prince George

Episcopal Ordinations at the Cathedral 
On the 3rd of January, 2013, Pope Benedict XVI appointed Msgr. Stephen Jensen as the Bishop of Prince George.

To celebrate his episcopal ordination, the diocese held a Mass of Installation at 7pm Pacific Time inside the Sacred Heart Cathedral.

Awards 
In 2014, the Sacred Heart Cathedral was recognised for 90 years of history within the city by the Prince George Heritage Commission.

See also 
Catholic Church
Catholic Church in Canada
Archdiocese of Vancouver

References 

Roman Catholic cathedrals in British Columbia
Buildings and structures in Prince George, British Columbia